Kolaigaran is a 2019 Indian Tamil-language action thriller film directed by Andrew Louis of Leelai fame. The film stars Arjun, Vijay Antony, and Ashima Narwal, while Nassar and Seetha play supportive roles. The music is scored by Simon K. King Principal photography of the film commenced on 5 June 2018.  The film follows an investigation in which a woman and her mother are suspected of murder after a disfigured corpse is found, while their neighbor claims to have committed it instead, much to the surprise of cops. The film was released theatrically on 7 June 2019. It opened to positive reviews.

The movie is heavily inspired by the 2012 South Korean thriller Perfect Number which was based on the Japanese mystery novel The Devotion of Suspect X which had earlier been adapted in 2008 in Japanese as Suspect X. The movie was also loosely inspired by Agatha Christie's mystery novel  The Body in the Library.

Plot 

The movie begins with a murder of a mysterious lady who is killed by an unknown person inside a house. In another scene, Prabhakaran (Vijay Antony) is seen surrendering to the police. The scene shifts to Prabhakaran's past. Prabhakaran and Dharini (Ashima Narwal) are neighbours, and each morning, they coincidentally greet each other as they step out of their homes while stepping out to their respective workplaces. Although Dharini's friend who sees this happen each day warns her to be careful of Prabhakaran as she suspects this as a planned execution, Dharini dismisses her opinion as being paranoid.

Meanwhile, a gruesome murder occurs at night in a desolate area in Chennai where a man is killed and burned. The next day the body is found by the locals and a crime branch cop named DCP Karthikeyan (Arjun) is assigned to the case. The police were not able to identify the murder victim due to his deformed face, however, Karthikeyan finds the half-burnt tailor tag from the clothes of the victim and assumes that the person is someone from a different city. He starts an investigation on complaints of missing guests at hotels within Chennai, and from the information extracted from the tag, he discovers that the murdered man is Vamsi, who is the younger brother of an influential minister in Andhra Pradesh.

Checking on the background of Vamsi, Karthikeyan learns that Vamsi is a habitual molester who used to stalk and harass Dharini, leading Dharini and her mother Lakshmi (Seetha) to escape to Chennai without his knowledge two years ago. Karthikeyan starts with his investigation with Dharini and Lakshmi, who admit to their past connection with Vamsi, much to Karthikeyan's surprise. Similarly, Karthikeyan investigates Prabhakaran on the whereabouts of his neighbours on the date of the murder. Meanwhile, Prabhakaran contacts Dharini via his office landline phone and asks her to do as instructed.

Theoretically speaking, Karthikeyan firmly believes that the murder has something to do with Dharini and Lakshmi and he also suspects they could not have done it on their own without a male's assistance. During his investigation, Karthikeyan also learns that Prabhakaran is a former Hyderabad-based IPS officer who is renowned for solving murders. However, when approached for help on solving the case, Prabhakaran claims that he can offer no help. This strengthens Karthikeyan's suspicions on Prabhakaran, despite his team's opinions against the idea. In a sudden turn of events, Karthikeyan learns that Prabhakaran has surrendered for the murder. During the course of interrogation, Prabhakaran reveals that he and Dharini are secret lovers. When Prabhakaran learns about Dharini's past with Vamsi, he wants to help Dharini and kills Vamsi without Dharini's knowledge. However, when Dharini was asked about Prabhakaran's story, she claims that she barely knows him, which leads the investigators to believe that Prabhakaran is suffering from a serious case of delusions. To further cement the fact that Prabhakaran is the sole murderer and, Dharini and Lakshmi are not, a listening device is found in Prabhakaran's house to prove that it's through this he came to know about Vamsi. So the tale takes its turn in the final minutes and all of the police, but Karthikeyan, believe that the case can be closed as the murderer Prabhakaran has surrendered. Karthikeyan could not believe that Prabhakaran, a police officer who is specialised in murder cases, could make amateur mistakes when disposing of Vamsi's body.

Karthikeyan ponders on his suspicions that the murderers of Vamsi were indeed Dharini and Lakshmi and thus further investigates on Prabhakaran's motive to surrender instead of them. It was found that Prabhakaran who was an IPS officer in Andhra Pradesh, lived happily with his wife, Aaradhanaa (Ashima Narwal), who bore a resemblance to Dharini. Unfortunately, she was murdered by Ali (Sampath), an escaped criminal, who considers himself to be Prabhakaran's enemy (as shown in the opening scene). Prabhakaran resigns his job as a police and starts to search for Ali, who escaped after murdering his wife. When he learns that the murderer is in Chennai, he moves to Chennai to avenge the death of Aaraadhanaa. When Dharini and Lakshmi killed Vamsi in self-defence, Prabhakaran wanting to help Dharini as she resembles his own passed wife, plots and kills his wife's murderer the next day and conceals his body instead of Vamsi to misdirect the case investigators from suspecting Dharini and Lakshmi. Karthikeyan, gained a newfound respect for Prabhakaran after learning the truth and decides to keep as a secret.

Cast

Production 
The first look poster of the film featuring Vijay Antony and Arjun was unveiled on 5 June 2018. The shooting of the film went on floors on the same day following a ceremonial pooja. The film is directed by Andrew Louis as his second assignment, who is also the friend of Vijay Antony and eventually returned to his directorial venture after a decade who also shot to prominence for his 2012 directorial venture Leelai. Vijay Antony was signed to play the lead role while he was busy shooting for Thimiru Pudichavan.

The filmmakers roped in Arjun opposite Vijay Antony to play an important role in the film while he was committed for Irumbu Thirai (2018). Indian-Australian model Ashima Narwal was also approached to play the female lead role in the film, with the latter making her Tamil film debut. The role of Ashima is speculated to be an innocent character named Dharini from Hyderabad. However, the filmmakers refused to reveal the exact roles of Vijay Antony and Arjun. The filmmakers have revealed that about half of the portions of the shooting segment was completed and as of 29 December 2018 it was also reported that Arjun has wrapped his shoot portions of the film. The shooting of the film was entirely in Chennai.

The film was marketed and distributed by G. Dhananjayan of BOFTA Media Works Pvt Ltd.

Soundtrack 
The soundtrack was composed by Simon K. King, whose last film composed was the Sibiraj-starrer Sathya. This film also marks Vijay Antony's second film to have a different music director after India Pakistan (2015).

Release
The film released theatrically on 7 June 2019.

References

External links 

 

2019 films
2010s Tamil-language films
2019 action thriller films
2019 crime action films
2019 crime thriller films
Indian crime action films
Indian action thriller films
Indian crime thriller films
Films shot in Chennai
Films set in Chennai
Films about murder
Indian police films
Films based on Japanese novels
Indian remakes of Japanese films
Indian remakes of South Korean films
2010s police films
Films based on works by Keigo Higashino